Konstantin (Kote) Chlaidze is a Georgian film director.

Biography
Konstantin (Kote) Chlaidze was born January 31, 1973, in Tbilisi, Georgia, in a family of the composer George (Gogi) Chlaidze.

He is a graduate of the Georgian State Institute of Cinema and Theatre (1995).

During 1996-98 he was the head of television crew for the educational system public support program. During those two years he also took the advanced film direction course.

Konstantin Chlaidze worked as a director for TBC TV during 1998-2000 and held the same position on the 9th channel during 2002–2004. He have worked at the Georgian National Film Center since 2005, on the following positions:
 
• 2005-2008 - Deputy director

• 2008-2010 – Director

• 2010-2014 – Head of Department at Film Commission

• 2014 – Director for Regional Projects

In 2010 he was an initiator and co-author of ‘Development Strategy of Georgian film’.

Filmography

In Development
 Khvedri (The Lot)

Producer
 Ramaz Chkhikvadze (Full-length documentary), Directed by Aleksandre Rekhviashvili, 2013
 My City, Series of television programs, TV network Artarea, 2014

Director
 The Bet, 2 minutes, 2002 
 Mirza's Birthday, 8 minutes, 2011

Screenwriter
 The Bet, 2 minutes, 2002 
 Mirza's Birthday, 8 minutes, 2011

Cinematographer
 Mirza's Birthday, (2011)

References

External links

 Konstantine Chlaidze
 Konstantin Chlaidze on EAVE
 Konstantin Chlaidze on YOUTUBE
 Mirzas Birthday

1973 births
Living people
Film directors from Georgia (country)
Screenwriters from Georgia (country)
Film people from Tbilisi